The London, Brighton and South Coast Railway C2 class was a class of 0-6-0 steam locomotives, intended for heavy freight trains.  Fifty-five were built by the Vulcan Foundry between 1893 and 1902 to the design of Robert J. Billinton. Forty-five of these were later rebuilt between 1908 and 1940, with a larger boiler as the  C2X class.

C2 class

In January 1891, Robert Billinton was given authority to build ten new 0-6-0 freight locomotives, to supplement William Stroudley's C1 class of 1882-7. However, at the time, Brighton railway works was fully committed building Billinton's various classes of radial tanks and so tenders were sought from outside contractors. Ultimately the Vulcan Foundry agreed to construct these ten locomotives, and further orders were received at intervals until 55 had been purchased by February 1902. The class were therefore nicknamed 'Vulcans'.

The new class were not as powerful as their predecessors but were found to be both reliable and also capable of running at speed, thereby enabling them to be used on secondary passenger and excursion duties. As a result, a further ten were ordered from Vulcan Foundry, which were delivered 1893-4, and twenty five delivered 1900-1902.

C2X class

During the first decade of the twentieth century the railway experienced a rapid growth in freight traffic and by 1905 their locomotives were no longer capable of hauling the heaviest trains without loss of time. Douglas Earle Marsh's initial response was to introduce his C3 class with a larger boiler in 1906, but the performance of these also proved to be disappointing.

However, in 1908 Marsh rebuilt one C2 with a larger diameter C3 steel boiler and an extended smokebox. In doing so he created an excellent powerful freight locomotive that was classified "C2X", and nicknamed 'Large Vulcans.' The modification was so successful that twenty-nine out of the original fifty-five members of the class were similarly rebuilt by the end of 1912. By this time the class were beginning to struggle to keep time when hauling the heaviest freight trains and began to be superseded on these by the K class 2-6-0 in 1913/14, but were nevertheless kept very busy during the First World War on military supply and munitions trains, and three further C2’s had been rebuilt by the end of 1922.

After the First World War Lawson Billinton acquired ten spare boilers for the class incorporating his own top feed apparatus. These were clearly visible when fitted because of the presence of a second dome.

Grouping and Nationalisation

All of the C2 and C2X locomotives passed to the Southern Railway in 1923, and nine further examples were rebuilt during 1924-5, as the original boilers became due for replacement. However, the trade recession of the early 1930s caused a decline in freight traffic resulting in the withdrawal of seven of the remaining C2 locomotives by the end of 1937. The advent of the Second World War meant that four other survivors were rebuilt in 1939 and 1940 and that the remaining three unrebuilt C2 locomotives remained in service until after the nationalisation of the railways to British Railways in 1948. Those remaining were all withdrawn between 1948 and 1950.

The C2X locomotives remained in regular use on secondary freight trains for a further decade and most had completed very impressive mileages for freight locomotives before they were all withdrawn between 1957 and February 1962. The last two examples were based at Three Bridges and Brighton and had completed  and  respectively.

No examples have been preserved.

Accidents and incidents
On 18 April 1918, a freight train became divided, with the rear portion coming to a stand inside Redhill Tunnel. Owing to a signalman's error, a freight train hauled by locomotive No. 541 ran into it. A third freight train hauled by locomotive No. 536 ran into the wreckage. The third train was carrying ammunition and explosives bound for Newhaven, but fortunately there was no fire and there were no serious injuries. It took forty hours to clear the potentially explosive debris from the tunnel.
In October of 1940, No. 2550 ran into a bomb crater while carrying a goods train.
Recovery of the locomotive took more than three months.

Locomotive Summary

References

External links 
 Semg gallery
 Class C2 details; Rail UK
 Class C2X details; Rail UK

C2
0-6-0 locomotives
Vulcan Foundry locomotives
Railway locomotives introduced in 1893
Scrapped locomotives
Standard gauge steam locomotives of Great Britain
Freight locomotives